The Northeast Coast campaign (1724) occurred during Father Rale's War from March 1724 – September 1724. The Wabanaki Confederacy  of Acadia attacked the coast of present-day Maine that was below the Kennebec River, the border of Acadia and New England. They attacked English settlements on the coast of present-day Maine between Berwick and Mount Desert Island. Casco (also known as Falmouth and Portland) was the principal settlement. The 1723 campaign was so successful along the Maine frontier that William Dummer ordered its evacuation to the blockhouses in the spring of 1724.

In March and April the Wabanaki killed 30 British settlers. The most significant battle was between Captain Josiah Winslow (older brother of John Winslow) who was stationed at Fort St. George. He with 16 troops were going down river in two whale boats when they were ambushed by the Tarrantines (Mi'kmaq). All but three were killed, including Josiah Winslow.

The natives then attacked Captain Samuel Penhallow at Fort Menaskoux, Arrowsick, killing numerous cattle and taking three prisoners.

The campaign began at sea against the British fishing vessels. The Mi'kmaq from Cape Sable Island, Nova Scotia participated in the naval warfare. They killed 22 and took 23 prisoners

In response, the British targeted Father Rale.

Links 
Benjamin Coleman's memoir

References 

Pre-statehood history of Maine
1724 in the Thirteen Colonies